Lamy is a German fountain pen brand and producer.

Lamy may also refer to:

 Lamy (surname)
 Lamy, New Mexico, United States
Lamy station
 Fort Lamy, former name of  N'Djamena, Chad
 Lamy River, former name of the East River, Guangdong, China
 Lamy (and Rinck), catalogue of Peruvian stamp cancellations

See also 
 Lami (disambiguation)